Feilding Old Boys Oroua is a rugby club based at Nelson Street in Feilding and Kimbolton Road in Kimbolton, Manawatu District, New Zealand. It is a constituent club of the Manawatu Rugby Union and play under the name "The Stags", although the club is often referred to as "FOBO".

In 2009 the Feilding Old Boys club merged with the Oroua club, based in Kimbolton. The club also combined rugby and netball clubs.

The main rival club is Feilding commonly referred to as Feilding Yellows.  The respective club-rooms are based on either side of the rugby field at Johnston Park.

Oroua union

An Oroua union was formed in 1896 comprising teams from Cheltenham, Colyton, Ruahine, Birmingham (now Kimbolton) and Apiti. The union was disbanded in 1898 and in 1909 Oroua became a sub-union of the  Manawatu union.

Honours

The Stags made the 2010 Hankins Shield final but lost 11–10 to Varsity, the Massey University team.  In 2018 the Stags went one better to win the Hankins Shield beating the Feilding Yellows 24–22 in the final.  The club's women's team have won the Prue Christie Cup in 2015, 2016 and 2018.

References

New Zealand rugby union teams